Bruno Barabani (born 26 July 1932) is a Brazilian former weightlifter. He competed at the 1952 Summer Olympics, the 1956 Summer Olympics and the 1960 Summer Olympics.

References

External links
 

1932 births
Living people
Brazilian male weightlifters
Olympic weightlifters of Brazil
Weightlifters at the 1952 Summer Olympics
Weightlifters at the 1956 Summer Olympics
Weightlifters at the 1960 Summer Olympics
Sportspeople from São Paulo
Pan American Games medalists in weightlifting
Pan American Games silver medalists for Brazil
Weightlifters at the 1955 Pan American Games
20th-century Brazilian people
21st-century Brazilian people